Jean-Delphin Alard (8 March 181522 February 1888) was a French violinist, composer, and teacher. He was the son-in-law of Jean-Baptiste Vuillaume, and had Pablo de Sarasate amongst his students.

Biography
Alard was born in Bayonne, the son of an amateur violinist. From 1827 he was a pupil of F. A. Habeneck at the Paris Conservatoire, where he succeeded Pierre Baillot as professor in 1843, retaining the post till 1875. He was also a pupil of François-Joseph Fétis.

His playing was full of fire and point, and his compositions had a great success in France, while his violin school had a wider vogue and considerably greater value. He was a representative of the modern French school of violin playing, composed nocturnes, duets, études, etc., for the violin, and was the author of an Ecole du violon, which was adopted by the Conservatoire. Mention should also be made of his edition in 40 parts of a selection of violin compositions by the most eminent masters of the 18th century, Les Maitres classiques du violon (Schott). Alard died in Paris.

Notes

References

External links 
 
 Alard's Ten studies for violin with accompaniment of a second violin Op.10 Score from Sibley Music Library Digital Scores Collection

1815 births
1888 deaths
People from Bayonne
Burials at Montmartre Cemetery
French male composers
Academic staff of the Conservatoire de Paris
19th-century French composers
19th-century French male classical violinists